Pyen (Hpyin, Phen) is a Loloish language of Burma.  It is spoken by about 700 people in two villages near Mong Yang, Shan State, Burma, just to the north of Kengtung.

Pyen borrows more from Lahu and Shan, while Bisu borrows more from Northern Thai and Standard Thai. Pyen and Bisu are both mutually intelligible, since the two form a dialect chain along with Laomian and Laopin of China, and some Phunoi varieties of Laos (Person 2007).

References

http://sealang.net/sala/archives/pdf8/person2007preliminary.pdf
Shintani Tadahiko. 2009. The Pyen (or Phen) language: its classified lexicon. Fuchu (Tokyo-to): Research Institute for Languages and Cultures of Asia and Africa.

Southern Loloish languages
Languages of Myanmar